The Bondi Brothers Store is a historic commercial building at 104 Madison Street in downtown Clarendon, Arkansas.  It is a two-story brick building, with modest Italianate styling.  Its storefront has been altered to have plate glass over much of the front, but the recessed entrance remains, with an original transom window.  The store was built in 1904 by Ike and Ed Bondi, sons of German immigrants who established a successful clothing store.

The building was listed on the National Register of Historic Places in 1984.

See also
National Register of Historic Places listings in Monroe County, Arkansas

References

Commercial buildings on the National Register of Historic Places in Arkansas
Commercial buildings completed in 1904
Buildings and structures in Monroe County, Arkansas
National Register of Historic Places in Monroe County, Arkansas